The women's artistic gymnastics competition at the 2012 Pacific Rim Gymnastics Championships was held on March 16 and 18, 2012, at the Comcast Arena and Comcast Community Ice Rink in Everett, Washington.

Team final

Seniors

All-around

Vault

Uneven bars

Balance beam

Floor

Juniors

All-around

Vault

Uneven bars

Balance beam

Floor

References 

2012
Pacific Rim Gymnastics Championships